Saint John Vianney Seminary may refer to:

Schools
 Saint John Vianney Seminary (Minnesota), a college seminary in Saint Paul, Minnesota
 Saint John Vianney Seminary (Denver), a theological seminary in Denver, Colorado
 Saint John Vianney Seminary (Miami), a college seminary in Miami, Florida